The South Georgia shag (Leucocarbo georgianus), also known as the South Georgia cormorant, is a marine cormorant native to South Georgia and a few other subantarctic islands in the South Atlantic Ocean.

Taxonomy
The South Georgia shag is one of the blue-eyed shags (genus Leucocarbo), although some authors have placed it in the genus Phalacrocorax. It has formerly been considered a subspecies of the imperial shag (L. atriceps), but it is now usually treated as a full species. It is usually considered to be restricted to South Georgia and Shag Rocks, with populations in the South Sandwich Islands and South Orkney Islands now referred to as a distinct species; the Antarctic shag (P. bransfieldensis).

References

External links
 

South Georgia shag
Birds of islands of the Atlantic Ocean
Birds of subantarctic islands
South Georgia shag